Ryongch'ŏn station is a railway station in Ryongch'ŏn-ŭp, Ryongch'ŏn County, North P'yŏngan Province, North Korea. It is the junction point of the P'yŏngŭi and Tasado lines of the Korean State Railway.

History
The station, originally called Yangsi station, was opened on 31 October 1939 by the Tasado Railway, along with the rest of the Tasado Line from Sinŭiju to Tasado Port. The Sinŭiju–Yangsi section of the line was transferred to the Chosen Government Railway as the Yangsi Line on 1 April 1943, and the station received its current name in July 1945.

The Ryongch'ŏn disaster was a major accident that occurred at Ryongch'ŏn station on 22 April 2004, when a train carrying flammable cargo exploded.

Services
There are five daily return commuter trains between Ryongch'ŏn and Tasado stations.

References

Railway stations in North Korea
Buildings and structures in North Pyongan Province
Railway stations opened in 1939
1939 establishments in Korea